Spyridium glaucum is a species of flowering plant in the family Rhamnaceae and is endemic to a restricted area of south-western Western Australia. It is an erect or spreading shrub with egg-shaped leaves, and clusters of 3 to 6 rusty-hairy flowers.

Description
Flowering occurs from September to November.

Taxonomy
Spyridium glaucum was first formally described in 1995 by Barbara Lynette Rye in the Nuytsia from specimens collected by Eleanor Marion Bennett near Ravensthorpe in 1979. The specific epithet (glaucum) means "bluish-green or grey", referring to the colour of the leaves.

Distribution
This spyridium is only known from hills north-east of Ravensthorpe in the Esperance Plains bioregion of south-western Western Australia.

References

glaucum
Rosales of Australia
Flora of Western Australia
Plants described in 1995
Taxa named by Barbara Lynette Rye